The 2016 Chinese Women's Super League season was the league's second season in the league's current incarnation, and the 20th total season of the women's association football league in China.

Results 

Jiangsu Suning won its playoff match against lower-division CWFL Zhejiang to remain in the CWSL. People's Liberation Army F.C. were relegated to the lower division league.

Honors and awards

Best XI 

 Source: Chinese Football Association

Annual awards 

 Best Young Player: Yan Jinjin, Shanghai Yongbai
 Best Coach of the League: Shui Qingxia, Shanghai Yongbai
 Golden Glove: Bi Xiaolin, Dalian Quanjian F.C.
 Golden Boot: Ma Xiaoxu, Dalian Quanjian F.C.
 Most Valuable Player: Ma Xiaoxu, Dalian Quanjian F.C.

References 

2016
2016–17 domestic women's association football leagues
2015–16 domestic women's association football leagues
+